Biju Viswanath is an Indian film director, director of photography, film editor and screenwriter. Across various genres, he has made numerous films in different languages, notably, English, Tamil, Malayalam, Irish, Swahili & Urdu.

He has also served as the jury member 50th National film Awards of India in 2003 and Kerala State Awards in 2003

Career
Viswanath's directorial debut A Voyage is based on the works of Indian writer M. T. Vasudevan Nair, which was produced by veteran Malayalam screenwriter John Paul Puthusery. The movie premiered in Busan International Film Festival, and won the gold medal for Best Short Film in India as well as an Honourable Mention in Zanzibar International Film Festival.

His Urdu film Parwaaz (The Flight) won Special Prize in Patras Film Festival. Viswanath won two awards for Best Cinematography and Best Screenplay in New York Independent Film Festival for his feature film Marathon (2010).

His English feature film Déjàvu, which was produced by editor A. Sreekar Prasad, featuring various British actors, had its international premiere at Busan International Film Festival in 2001 and at the 54th Locarno International Film Festival. Another feature film of his,Viola, won Golden palm in the Mexico International Film festival.

Viswanath made three Irish films based on the works on the poet writer Celia de Fréine.

His First American Feature film Marathon is based on the true story of American poet William Morris Meredith, Jr. Viswanath won two awards for Best Cinematography and Best Screenplay in New York Independent Film Festival for Marathon (2010).

Viswanath's venture in Swahili is Shadow Tree, a film which was shot in Zanzibar, Tanzania. The film won the Special Award in Skepto Film Festival in Italy,

His Indian feature film Orange Mittai Tamil was co-written and produced by Vijay Sethupathi. Another Tamil drama film Chennai Palani Mars won two awards in USA: Grand jury prize in Los Angeles Motion Picture film festival and Best narrative feature in Pinnacle film Awards.

Filmography

Awards

 2009: Best Cinematography at New York City International Film Festival: Marathon
 2011: Golden Palm Award at Mexico International Film Festival: Viola
 2014: SIGNIS Award for Best Short Film at Zanzibar International Film Festival and Avant-guarde & Experimental Special Award at Skepto Film Festival: Shadow Tree
 2019: Gold Award for Best Feature Film at Pinnacle Film Awards: Chennai Palani Mars
 2022: Best of Show and Best Feature Documentary at Pinnacle Film Awards: How to make F**ked Up Movies

References

External links
 

 https://www.deccanchronicle.com/150802/entertainment-mollywood/article/i-don%E2%80%99t-make-films-film-festivals-biju-viswanath
 https://www.nowrunning.com/news/malayalam/raghuvaran-could-have-become-an-international-star-biju-viswanath/14518/story.htm
 https://www.theindiapost.com/nation/chandigarh/popularizing-literature-cinema-biju-viswanath/
 https://www.hindustantimes.com/chandigarh/cinema-in-write-direction/story-0z6qITdR25mqYM6v3G9AOO.html
 https://www.behindwoods.com/tamil-director/biju-viswanath/orange-mittai-director-biju-viswanaths-interview-on-the-film-vijay-sethupathi-and-many-more.html
 https://www.tribuneindia.com/2013/20130303/ttlife1.htm#2

English-language film directors
Living people
Malayalam film directors
Malayalam film cinematographers
Indian male screenwriters
Year of birth missing (living people)